Rashad Jamaal Butler (born February 10, 1983) is a former American football offensive tackle. He was drafted by the Carolina Panthers in the third round of the 2006 NFL Draft. He played college football at the University of Miami.

College career
Butler played college football at the University of Miami. He started parts of three seasons, including most of 2004 when Eric Winston was injured.

Professional career

Carolina Panthers
He was drafted in the third round of the 2006 NFL Draft by the Carolina Panthers. Thought to be a project due to his relative light weight for an NFL offensive tackle, he was inactive for his rookie year. He actually lost weight and was cut by the Panthers after 2007 training camp.

Houston Texans
After signing with the Texans, he was discovered to suffer from ulcerative colitis, a chronic medical condition which prevented him from bulking up. Under medical care, Butler was able to regain the lost weight relatively quickly.

Butler did not appear in any games for the Texans in 2008. A restricted free agent in the 2009 offseason, Butler signed his one-year tender offer from the Texans on April 7.

Cleveland Browns
Butler signed with the Cleveland Browns on May 8, 2013.

Pittsburgh Steelers
Butler signed with the Pittsburgh Steelers on November 30, 2013.  He left the Steelers two days later on December 2, 2013 for personal reasons.

See also
 List of people diagnosed with ulcerative colitis

References

External links
Houston Texans bio
Miami Hurricanes bio

1983 births
Living people
Sportspeople from Palm Beach, Florida
American football offensive tackles
Miami Hurricanes football players
Carolina Panthers players
Houston Texans players
Cleveland Browns players
Pittsburgh Steelers players
Players of American football from Florida